"Why" is a song written by Barry Gibb and composed by Andy Gibb, fourth and last single released on the album Shadow Dancing. Released as a single in September 1978 around the same time as "(Our Love) Don't Throw it All Away". It was his only single that was not charted in any countries.

Writing and recording
Barry wrote the lyrics for this song while Andy composed the melody. As Andy reveals:

It was recorded in Wally Heider Studios in Los Angeles, California. Barry sings background vocals on this track especially on the refrain and chorus. Barry also used his falsetto voice on this track as well as "Shadow Dancing", "Don't Throw it All Away" and "An Everlasting Love". The song features a guitar work by Jock Bartley of Firefall. John Sambataro, who later worked with Steve Winwood who also sing background vocals on the album, plays slide guitar on this track as it was featured on the intro and interlude.

Release
The two US singles have consecutive catalog numbers and the same B side, as if "Why" was a quick replacement for "(Our Love) Don't Throw it All Away". (The song was in fact the American hit.)  This track was produced by Barry, Albhy Galuten and Karl Richardson, but the B-side was "One More Look at the Night" written by Andy Gibb and produced only by Galuten and Richardson (and was also used as the B-side of "Don't Throw it All Away") In the UK, its B-side was "Fool for a Night" was originally released on Andy's 1977 debut album Flowing Rivers.

Personnel
Andy Gibb — lead vocals
Barry Gibb — backing vocals
John Sambataro — backing vocals, slide guitar
Joey Murcia — guitar
Jock Bartley — guitar
George Bitzer — synthesizer
Harold Cowart — bass
Ron Ziegler — drums
Joe Lala — percussion

References

1978 singles
1978 songs
Songs written by Barry Gibb
Songs written by Andy Gibb
Andy Gibb songs
RSO Records singles
Disco songs
Song recordings produced by Barry Gibb
Song recordings produced by Albhy Galuten